Reynolds Mountain is located in the Lewis Range, Glacier National Park in the U.S. state of Montana.  Reynolds Mountain is situated along the Continental Divide and is easily seen from Logan Pass by looking due south from the pass. Hidden Lake is located below Reynolds Mountain to the west. Reynolds is a class 2(3) climb via the southwestern talus slope route that allows many people to easily climb the peak. The mountain was named for Charles E. Reynolds, a writer for Forest and Stream magazine, and assistant to the magazine's editor, George Bird Grinnell, who named many of the features in Glacier National Park. The mountain's name was officially adopted in 1910 by the U.S. Board on Geographic Names.

Geology

Like other mountains in Glacier National Park, Reynolds Mountain is composed of sedimentary rock laid down during the Precambrian to Jurassic periods.

Gallery

See also
 Mountains and mountain ranges of Glacier National Park (U.S.)
 Geology of the Rocky Mountains

References

External links
 Reynolds Mountain: Weather

Mountains of Flathead County, Montana
Mountains of Glacier County, Montana
Reynolds
Lewis Range
Mountains of Montana